The Goathouse Refuge in Pittsboro, North Carolina, is a nonprofit no-kill animal sanctuary for cats that is run on a volunteer-basis. The refuge is cage-free with the cats roaming around within the boundaries of the property. Founded in 2007 by Italian-born artist Siglinda Scarpa, the refuge can hold up to 300 cats on a 16-acre farm. There is an art gallery located on the first floor of the house where Scarpa sells her handmade art such as pottery, sculptures, and cookware to help support the refuge.



Founding

Siglinda Scarpa says she had issues with communication as a child, stating that "people were not seeing me, that they were talking, but never to me." Her father gave her a stray kitten, but when it was a year old, it became very ill and died. After his death, Scarpa decided to take in as many cats as possible, with the hopes of eventually creating a safe haven for cats. Scarpa created the Goathouse Refuge in 2007, naming it after an old goat who came with the plantation house and the 16 acre property. Originally, the land was just intended for her pottery studio. After the house and studio burned down, Scarpa rebuilt it with plans that included a sanctuary for cats, using personal resources and proceeds from her pottery sales to make it possible.

Operations

As a nonprofit shelter, the Refuge is run mainly by volunteers. There are two shifts of at least two volunteers each who look after the cats and socialize them to be ready for adoption. In its first five years, the refuge has found homes for over 900 cats.  No cats are rejected or subjected to euthanasia unless past all hope of recovery. Unadoptable cats may live out their lives on the property as well. 
Goathouse Refuge relies on donations to help cover medical treatment, food, toys and other items. The Goathouse Refuge has the option to sponsor a cat by donating to cover their adoption fees so that the cat may have a higher chance of being adopted. The refuge also provides "virtual cats" as gifts and will send the donor a photo of a cat of their choice, as well as a behind-the-scenes story about them.

Welfare

In March 2013, the Goathouse Refuge was a cover story in the Indy Week paper. The article claims that there are too many cats falling prey to illness, and that the sanctuary is out of control: "One local veterinarian has treated about 35 cats from owners who had recently adopted from the Goathouse." The author, Lisa Sorg, says that according to former volunteers at the Goathouse Refuge, there are twice as many cats on the premises as recommended by a veterinarian, and that Scarpa makes volunteers sign an anti-defamation agreement and instructs them to lie to state inspectors, among other allegations that Scarpa denied or justified. Just over a day after the article's release, the comments section on the Indy Week website became so heated that Denise Prickett, INDY Editorial Web Director, posted "We have closed comments on this story for the weekend. We will reopen comments Monday morning. All future comments must respond directly to the story and must be civil. Comments that do not follow these guidelines will be removed."

Sources

External links
website

Non-profit organizations based in North Carolina
Buildings and structures in Chatham County, North Carolina
Animal sanctuaries
Organizations established in 2007
Domestic cat welfare organizations
Animal welfare organizations based in the United States